Croceverde is an outlying suburb of Palermo, Sicily in Italy. It has less than 5000 residents. Croceverde is close to the suburb of Ciaculli. It has been important within the history of the Cosa Nostra, and is relatively rural in character.

Zones of Palermo
Greco Mafia clan
Neighbourhoods in Italy